Perle Morroni (born 15 October 1997) is a French professional footballer who plays as a left-back for Division 1 Féminine club Lyon and the France national team.

Personal life
Born in France, Morroni is of Ivorian descent.

Career statistics

Club
As of 4 June 2021

International

International goals

Honours

Club
Paris Saint-Germain
 Division 1 Féminine: 2020–21
 Coupe de France Féminine: 2017–18
 UEFA Women's Champions League runner-up: 2014–15, 2016–17

Lyon
 UEFA Women's Champions League: 2021–22
 Division 1 Féminine: 2021–22

International
 UEFA Women's Under-19 Championship: 2016

References

External links
 
 
 
 

1997 births
Living people
French women's footballers
France women's youth international footballers
French sportspeople of Ivorian descent
Primera División (women) players
FC Barcelona Femení players
Footballers from Montpellier
Women's association football fullbacks
Paris Saint-Germain Féminine players
Division 1 Féminine players